Canalside Studios is a games company within the University of Huddersfield in West Yorkshire, England. The studio is permanently staffed by a core team of 8 placement students. Plans are in place for full-time students studying games-oriented courses to contribute content through projects to get their name in the credits.

History 

It was founded in 2006 to aid the professional development of computer games students and help them find employment within the industry.

In 2007 Canalside Studios achieved second place in the Microsoft Microsoft XNA Dream Build Play competition with Yo-Ho Kablammo. The game was released on 12 September 2009 on Xbox Live Arcade and received excellent reviews from the arcade community.

Subsequent to Yo-Ho Kablammo, Canalside Studios has released a B movie themed shooter called Missing Reel for Xbox Live Indie Games.

Canalside Studios was contracted by the Royal Armouries to produce educational games for display at their museum in Leeds and has also developed two games for display at the Frazier History Museum, Kentucky.

Descentium is the title currently in development.

Awards and recognition 

 "Game Republic 2019" - 2nd Place Best Team
 "Game Republic 2019" - 2nd Place Best Game Audio
 "Game Republic 2018" - Best Team
 "Game Republic 2018" - Best Game Design
 "Game Republic 2018" - 2nd Place Best Game Technology
 "Grads in Games Awards 2018" - Nominated Best Student Game
 "Game Republic 2016" - Best Team
 "Game Republic 2016" - 2nd Place Best Art & Animation
 "Game Republic 2016" - 2nd Place Best Game Technology
 "Game Republic 2016" - 3rd Place Best Design
 "X48 Game Competition 2010" - Best Art
 "Game Republic 2009" - Best Games Design
 "Game Republic 2009" - Best Team
 "Game Republic 2009" - Best Technical
 "X48 Game Competition 2009" - 1st Prize
 "X48 Game Competition 2009" - 2nd Prize
 "X48 Game Competition 2009" - Most Experimental Game
 "UK Imagine Cup" - 2008 Winners
 "Dream Build Play 2007" - 2nd Place

References

External links 
 Official Canalside Studios Website
 Microsoft DreamBuildPlay Website

University of Huddersfield
Video game companies of the United Kingdom
Video game development companies